Vaughn High School may refer to:
 Vaughn Occupational High School
 Vaughn High School (Vaughn, New Mexico) of the Vaughn Municipal Schools school district